Burnswark Hill, to the east of the A74(M) between Ecclefechan and Lockerbie in Dumfries and Galloway, Scotland, sits prominently in the landscape. Its rich history has been a consistent source of archaeological interpretation for generations. The most recent active archaeological research, undertaken by the Trimontium Trust, has furthered the understanding of the site narrative in respect of the apparent relationship between the local population and occupying Roman forces.

Burnswark Hill (also known as Birrenswark) represents succinct and prominent geological evidence of the interruption of sediment deposition by lava eruption followed by basalt flows. This geological activity from the Carboniferous period ensured that 300 million years later, the location would provide an ideal site for the strategic positioning of an Iron Age hillfort, one that in this instance measures an enclosed area of approximately 7ha.

The Iron Age hillfort, clearly observable in the landscape, is accompanied by evidence of an earlier Bronze Age burial cairn, Roman camps and potential fortlet, enclosures dated to the medieval period, a possible Civil War battery, and an Ordnance Survey triangulation station. The site is commanding and impressive, its history complex and intriguing.

Context 

The presumed Siege of Burnswark Hill was a battle for control of a Caledonian hillfort fought between the defending Caledonian Selgovae tribe and Roman legions taking part in Quintus Lollius Urbicus' conquest of the Scottish Lowlands in about 140 AD. The siege resulted in a Roman victory.

Little is known about the battle from historical texts save from its context which has been well documented. Much of what is known has been gleaned from archaeological work at the site of the battle, for example troop positions and movements.

After the death of the Emperor Hadrian, Antoninus Pius rose to the throne and moved quickly to reverse the empire limit system put in place by his predecessor. Following his defeat of the Brigantes in 139 AD, Quintus Lollius Urbicus, the Roman Governor of Britannia, was ordered by Antoninus Pius to march north of Hadrian's Wall to conquer the Caledonian Lowlands, which were settled by the Otadini, Selgovae, Damnonii and the Novantae, and to push the frontier further north. Lollius Urbicus moved three legions into position initially establishing his supply routes from Coria and Bremenium and moved three legions, the Legio II Augusta from Caerleon, the Legio VI Victrix from Eboracum, and the Legio XX Valeria Victrix from Deva Victrix into the theatre between 139 and 140 AD, then moved his army, a force of at least 16,500 men, north of Hadrian's Wall.

The Selgovae, having settled in the regions of present-day Kirkcudbrightshire and Dumfriesshire immediately northwest of Hadrian's Wall, were amongst the first of the Caledonian tribes to face Lollius Urbicus's legions together with the Otadini. The Romans, who were well versed in warfare on hilly terrain, moved quickly to occupy strategic points and high ground, some of which had already been fortified by the Caledonians with hill forts. One such hill fort was located at present-day Burnswark, which commanded the western route north further into Caledonia.

Battle details

The Roman forces set up positions surrounding the hill fort and made two encampments on either side of the fort to effectively cut it off. It is believed that the two Roman camps housed around 6,000 soldiers composed of legions and auxiliary troops. Whereas the defenders would have been armed only with simple weapons, swords and shields, the Romans had complex siege weapons and made extensive use of slingers to deadly effect. It is believed that the defenders of the hill fort were almost entirely wiped out.

Aftermath

This was likely one of many battles that took place during the Roman campaign in the Caledonian Lowlands. By 142 AD, the Romans had pacified the entire area and had successfully moved the frontier north to the newly built Antonine Wall.

Artillery range

Some archaeologists have found that the evidence at Burnswark does not suggest a siege designed to capture the hillfort, but rather the remains of a facility used to train soldiers in the use of slingshot and catapults.  The use of stone facings in the camps suggests a more permanent structure than would be required to dislodge the occupiers of the hillfort.  Some projectiles recovered, the lead shots, had been phased out in active employment by the time of the construction of Hadrian's Wall.  Others, such as stone balls, had been coloured red, possibly to help in their recovery for reuse.  A fortlet in one of the Roman camps appears to have been built before the camp, suggesting that the Romans already controlled the area.

See also

 List of hill forts in Scotland
 Scotland during the Roman Empire

References

Further reading

A.J. Woodman (with C. Kraus), Tacitus: Agricola, Cambridge: Cambridge University Press, 2014.

140s conflicts
Battles involving the Roman Empire
Battles involving the Picts
Military history of Roman Britain
Scotland in the Roman era
2nd century in Scotland
140s in the Roman Empire
140
Roman fortified camps in Scotland